The 2018 AFF Futsal Championship will be the 15th edition of the tournament. The tournament will be held in November 2018 in Yogyakarta, Indonesia

Cambodia  participate in this tournament after being absent 6 years. The last edition they played before was in 2012.

Australia, Laos and Singapore did not join while Philippines withdrew after drawing.

Qualified teams 
There was no qualification, and all entrants advanced to the final tournament.
The following 11 teams from member associations of the ASEAN Football Federation entered the tournament.

Venue
All matches are held in Yogyakarta.

Group stage
All matches are to be played in Indonesia. Times listed are UTC+7.

Group A

Group B

Knockout stage
In the knockout stage, extra time and penalty shoot-out are used to decide the winner if necessary, excluding the third place match.

Bracket

Semi-finals

Third place match

Final

Winners

Goalscorers 
10 goals

 Jetsada Chudech

5 goals

 Awaluddin Nawi
 Apiwat Chaemcharoen
 Nguyen Thanh Tin

4 goals

 Andri Kustiawan
 Subhan Faidasa
 Nawin Rattanawongswas
 Sarawut Phalaphruek

3 goals

 AlFajri Zikri
 Bambang Bayu
 Syauqi Saud
 Azri Rahman
 Khairul Effendy
 Ridzwan Bakri
 Naing Lin Tun Kyaw
 Phae Phyo Maung (forward)
 Muhammad Osamanmusa
 Pornmongkol Srisubseang
 Suthiporn Kladcharoen
 Warut Wangsama-aeo
 Chu Van Tien
 Vu Quoc Hung

2 goals

 Ardiansyah
 Marvin Alexa
 Abu Haniffa
 Azwann Ismail
 Saiful Nizam
 Keattiyot Chalaemkhet
 Phae Phyo Maung
 Nguyen Manh Dung
 Ton That Phi
 Tran Van Vu

1 goal

 Awangku Muhammad Naqib
 Kim Sokyuth
 Ros Rattanak
 Aditya Rasyid
 Fhandy Permana
 Randy Satria
 Rio Pangestu
 Syed Aizad
 Aung Zin Oo
 Hlaing Min Tun
 Kyaw Soe Moe
 Naing Ye Kyaw
 Nyein Min Soe
 Chaivat Jamgrajang
 Ronnachai Jungwongsuk
 Bendito Ximenes
 Romula Escurial
 Chau Duan Phat
 Dang Anh Tai

1 own goal

 Khalil Saab (against Timor-Leste)
 Iqbal Rahmatullah (against Malaysia)
 Azri Rahman (against Myanmar)

References

External links 
AFF Futsal Championship 2018
 Official website (with results and squads)

AFF Futsal Championship
AFF 2018
International futsal competitions hosted by Indonesia
AFF Futsal Championship
AFF Futsal Championship